Ampascachi is a village and rural municipality in Salta Province in northwestern Argentina.

Population
Ampascachi had 185 inhabitants (INDEC, 2001), representing a decrease of 45% compared to the 339 inhabitants (INDEC, 1991) from the previous census.

References

Populated places in Salta Province